This is a list of characters from the manga series Psychic Squad and its anime adaptations.  Many of the main characters are named after characters and chapters from The Tale of Genji.

B.A.B.E.L.

The Children

Future title: Queen of Catastrophe

The first heroine. Kaoru is a ten-year-old Level 7 psychokinetic (the maximum esper potency designation) and the reckless and zealous leader of "The Children" Special Esper Team alongside Shiho and Aoi that often goes overkill with her psychic powers. It is explained at one point that it was Kaoru that approached Shiho and Aoi in friendship when she was given over to B.A.B.E.L. five years ago and has generally established herself as the leader of the group. Under Minamoto's leadership (which she rejected until Minamoto shielded her from her own out-of-control telekinesis shortly after they met), Kaoru has opened up to demonstrate that she is a dynamic tomboy with lecherous tendencies that loves to have fun and keep Minamoto all to herself.

Kaoru's nuclear family is her elder sister Yoshimi and her mother Akie who are so devoted to their careers that they neglect to spend time with her because they are frightened of her powers. Even though she has yet to learn how to harbor it without acting upon it, Kaoru's affinity for gravure idol magazines being rooted in her admiration for her mother and elder sister is not unreasonable. Kaoru ages to 13 years old and starts junior high school with the other Children after the two-year timeskip at the end of the anime and at the end of volume 15 of the manga. Her crush on Minamoto appears to have grown into deeper forms of love (although she does not seem to understand what it is). As she grows, she starts dropping her old man habits, and grows more embarrassed and more interested in boys. She later realizes that she is in love with Minamoto and attempts to act more mature, and grow up quicker to make him more interested in her. She also grow more sad, if she does not know much of him, and get extremely jealous if Minamoto is interested in any other girl. When The Children make use of their limiters' "Triple Boost" feature that focuses the trio's powers into one of them, Kaoru obtains a special power called "Force of Absolution" that can nullify all hypnotic control over an individual, which comes at handy when confronting Black Phantom's brainwashed soldiers.

Her last name is for the Akashi lady, a lover of Genji, and her first name is after Kaoru, a son of another of Genji's wives.

Future title: Lightspeed Goddess

The second heroine. A ten-year-old esper with Level 7 teleportation capability, Aoi is the rational member of "The Children" Special Esper Team alongside Kaoru and Shiho that likes playing video games in her spare time. Like her teammates, Aoi is introduced at series inception as behaving in a somewhat cavalier manner that annoys her adult superiors. While she generally understands that having Level 7 telekinesis used as an attack is frightening and very dangerous, Aoi has a hard time understanding the human dark side and why anyone would be apprehensive of espers whose powers are more for investigation/inspection although it is not inane or impossible for her to teleport a person into an inanimate object. Born and raised in Kyoto, Aoi speaks in a Kansai dialect, including the usage of the honorific -han in place of the standard -san.

As a level 7 teleporter, she is very sensitive to hyperspace recognition and has shown to be capable of neutralising other espers' teleportation abilities to a certain extent and tracking teleporting espers in close by vicinities. Aoi ages to 13 years old and starts junior high school with the other Children after the two-year timeskip at the end of the anime and at the end of volume 15 of the manga. Comically, Aoi is still concerned about her smaller chest size in comparison to the other two Children. She like the rest of her team, falls in love with Minamoto, and grow jealous if he is interested in any other girls. Aoi is the most innocent of the Children, due Kaoru having a love for perverted actions, and Shiho understanding the human dark side.

She is named for Aoi, Genji's first wife.  Her last name may be a reference to Aoi's formal title, Aoi no Ue (葵の上).

Future title: Untouchable Empress

The third heroine. A ten-year-old esper with Level 7 psychometry, Shiho is the sarcastic, sharp-tongued and often childishly sadistic member of "The Children" Special Esper Team alongside Kaoru and Aoi. While initially not able to do much during missions aside from gathering information that is not immediately obvious from the environment, Shiho still supports her teammates by doing whatever she can, including being the sole member of the team wielding a pistol given to her by her father, which combined with her powers gives her supernatural accuracy.

Keenly aware of the world having a dark side and the folly of accepting everything at face value, Shiho is the first to realize why Minamoto works so well with them (his exclusion from elementary school because of his high intelligence) when she psychometrically probes one of his yearbooks. Her insecurity diminishing under his leadership, Shiho starts to refrain. Shiho generally adds ancillary comments that either explain complex elements of the Zettai Karen Children universe or insinuate one person or another (usually Minamoto) into undergoing an embarrassing/painful reprisal (usually Kaoru's telekinesis). Shiho often shows a more grown-up personality than the other children which can sometimes lean toward the dark side. Due to her psychometry, Shiho has a large fear of the supernatural world, in particular, spirits and ghosts. Shiho ages to 13 years old and starts junior high school with the other Children after the two-year timeskip at the end of the anime and at the end of volume 15 of the manga. Like Kaoru, Shiho's appearance changes slightly as she grows her hair longer. She like the rest of her team, falls in love with Minamoto, and grow jealous if he is interested in any other girls. She values her friendship with her teammates, and gets very angry with anyone that harms them.

Her last name is a reference to one of Genji's wives, the Third Princess; her first name evokes Murasaki, another one of Genji's wives. Murasaki is also the Japanese word for the color purple, the same color of Shiho's hair.

Voiced by: Yuichi Nakamura
The main protagonist. Despite having no esper powers, he has an outstanding intellect (in the pilot chapter, he is also an esper with level 7 negation of anti-esper powers). He is 20 years old at the start of the series and is the field leader of "The Children" Special Esper Team, not only giving them directions during missions but also overseeing their daily care. Even as they usually disobey and mistreat him, the girls highly esteem Minamoto, asking to reside with him soon after he is assigned to work with them. Nevertheless, the girls have shown to have grown positively under his watch (mostly because he's the only one who ever properly treated them as children).

Being good looking and usually more kind and responsible than his peers, Minamoto earns the affection of several females during the course of the series including The Children themselves who openly express their will to marry him once they become adults on several occasions and get angry on him when he gets too close to any other woman. Beside leading and raising the girls, his main concern throughout the series is toward averting the precognition of a mortal showdown with Kaoru in a war-torn city during Hyobu's esper-led war against normals a decade in the future. Just like the girls under his care, Minamoto also experienced the sadness of being neglected for being more capable than those around him, as during his childhood, because he was too intelligent, the other children could not stand him and he had to attend special lessons in Comerica, away from his family.

While good-natured and tolerant for the most part, there are times when he is pushed over his limits and comically displays an enraged Fist of the North Star-esque demeanor, complete with quotes, inspiring fear even on his superiors or The Children themselves. After the timeskip, Minamoto is assigned as supervisor to several other teams who act as support – "The Shadows of the Children", along with "The Explorer" and "The Sleeping Snow White." He also starts developing romantic feelings for Kaoru, although he keeps repressing them out of his obligation to properly guide her and his will to prevent their tragic fate.

He is named after Hikaru Genji (光 源氏), the protagonist of The Tale of Genji, who received the surname "Minamoto" upon being stripped of his royal status.

A young boy who becomes a classmate to Kaoru and the others in high school, he first met the Children when they saved him from a fire years before, and retained his memories even after he underwent hypnosis to forget about the incident at all, because he has a photographic memory. Since then Matsukaze has a crush on Kaoru and rejoiced upon meeting her again, a fact that is soon realized by everyone around them, except for Kaoru herself, who only considers him as a good friend. Realizing his potential to become a reliable commander like him, Minamoto convinces B.A.B.E.L. to hire Matsukaze as his apprentice and right hand man, taking him at missions as well, but Hyobu is suspicious of him, certain that he may be an agent of Black Phantom.

He is named after one of the chapters of the Tale of Genji, "Matsukaze".

B.A.B.E.L. Headquarters

The leader of B.A.B.E.L, he dotes on "The Children" all the time and spoils them rotten not realizing that this overindulgence is probably the reason for the bad behavior of "The Children". Taizo can and does point to Minamoto as the scapegoat for The Children's errancy and poor attitudes. Whether Taizo overindulges "The Children" because he really loves them or because he is frightened for his job/personal safety (after seeing Kaoru severely damage a shopping district trying to stop a criminal esper) remains to be seen; still, Taizo is extremely attached to Kaoru, Shiho, and Aoi (who are starting to realize that Taizo's intense affection for them is not entirely altruistic) and goes into a frenzy comparable to a Level 6 esper whenever he feels that "The Children" are in distress. He seems to have inhuman abilities, such being able to break apart handcuffs. He is willing to do anything to protect the children, which he states is because he lost a daughter at a young age, and has regretted ever since, and he sees the Children as daughters, and wishes to protect them.
His name is after the Kiritsubo Emperor, Genji's father.

Even if her job title is simply being Taizo's secretary or personal assistant, Kashiwagi is no exception to the sidekick/alter ego dynamic and is generally very handy to have around. It is very rare for either Taizo or Kashiwagi to be by themselves as Hyobu demonstrates when he hypnotically emulates Kashiwagi to fool Minamoto at one point. Kashiwagi performs many roles as she accompanies Taizo which include assisting with visual aids during mission briefings and preventing Taizo from giving an order or making a decision whose aftermath would most likely be rather messy. She seems to have a crush on Minamoto.
Her last name is after Kashiwagi, the eldest son of To no Chujo; her first name is for Lady Oborozukiyo.

Shuji Sakaki (賢木修二)
Code name: The Exploratory

Dr. Shuji Sakaki is the old-enough-to-know-better playboy psychometric physician of B.A.B.E.L. whose job it is to inspect espers at the conclusion of every mission as well as to take care of general medical needs, he also has a limited ability to control his own body functions. Before meeting Minamoto (who is originally a medical researcher before enrolling in an overseas supervisor course), Sakaki did not have anybody to understand him as a person and advocate for him. To compensate for this, he behaved like the typical sports jock—popular in school but dangerous if obstructed. Given how he had beaten up several people and how injured they were, it is not that unreasonable to speculate that Sakaki is very well-practiced in the martial arts and that it was probably in that forum that he discovered his psychometry and taught himself how to use it to his advantage. Fortunately, Sakaki saw fit to clean up his act after his Level 6 psychometry imports an admonishment to grow up from Minamoto even as he behaves as quite a lady's man. When charged the supervision of Kaoru and Shiho during Minamoto's convergent criminal quarry navigation mission in Kyoto, Sakaki demonstrates that he is a kid-at-heart as he competes with Shiho in a racing game (which he loses even though he uses every trick in the book to cheat) and in angling (Shiho teaching herself how to fish and successfully catching the quarry fish on her first try). They work together in repairing Professor Saisen's ruptured spleen and preparing the fish they caught into a tasty meal. He states the children were lucky to have met Minamoto when they did as they can act as children, while he was alone, and trusted no one causing his attitude.
"Sakaki" (賢木) was a chapter in The Tale of Genji.

Code name: The Sleeping Snow White

A girlish and playful energy vampire with eight decades of life under her belt and the capability to practice the same powers as Kaoru and her teammates that outranks Taizou who has established B.A.B.E.L. under her guidance, Fujiko awakens from her decade-long estivation when her former subordinate/kohai Kyousuke Hyobu establishes the organization P.A.N.D.R.A. to effect his ultimate objective – an esper-led war against humans. Being of the sentiment that Minamoto's leadership philosophy/practice will lead to his esper charges becoming exactly what Hyobu wants, Fujiko relieves Minamoto of his esper guardian duties to polish/refine him and generally shake things up not understanding that his relationship with Kaoru/Shiho/Aoi is a hybrid professional/family relationship. In her first appearance she immediately earns The Children's wrath by kissing Minamoto (as well as kissing them as well) and later earns their full fury by separating them from Minomoto. Fujiko believes in order for their relationship to become better, they (Minamoto more so) must all see each other in a more intimate matter, by forcing them into a relationship, much to Minamoto's disbelief. She has a great anger with Kyousuke, many time wanting to beat him up. She seems to be physically attracted to Minamoto and Sakaki and sometimes refers to herself in the third person.
Her name is reference to Lady Fujitsubo (藤壺) after Genji's stepmother.

The Doubleface
Natsuko Tokiwa (常盤奈津子)

Natsuko wields her Level 5 clairvoyance as one member of the Doubleface esper receptionist team alongside her partner Hotaru and is charged with identifying and intercepting possible incoming threats. Not only can she detect dangerous items such as packaged explosives or concealed personal weaponry, but Natsuko also can even tell if a visitor is in good hygienic repair. It would not be out of the question for Natsuko to use her clairvoyance to spy on a visitor during his time on the B.A.B.E.L. premises to ensure good behavior. She and Hotaru once threw cold water on Taizo when he was lusting after them during a tour of the B.A.B.E.L. facility to welcome Minamoto, indicating they might be young twenty-something adults. After the two-year timeskip, Natsuko along with Hotaru have been moved onto the battlefield in support positions.
Her name references the chapter "Tokonatsu" (常夏) in The Tale of Genji.

Hotaru Nowaki (野分ほたる)

Hotaru avails her Level 5 telepathy as the other member of The Doubleface esper receptionist team alongside her partner Natsuko. Hotaru is charged with reading the visitor's thoughts to determine whether or not they pose a threat to either the espers or B.A.B.E.L's other personnel. The infatuation that she and Natsuko share for Minamoto has ignited a low-level rivalry between the two even as they are often kept in the loop with all the drama involving Minamoto and his esper charges. Hotaru along with Natsuko have been moved onto the battlefield in support positions after the two-year timeskip, with their former occupation taken over by the elder Sasami sisters.
She is named after two chapters in The Tale of Genji, "Nowaki" (野分) and "Hotaru" (蛍).  Also, the character Hotaru, who was Genji's half-brother.

The Wild Cat

A sixteen-year-old Level 6 psychokinetic high-schooler originally known as "Kitty Cat", at the beginning Naomi's naive mistakes would make for a less-than-perfect working environment and would not be regarded as a laughing matter (either at the time or after the fact) under normal real-life circumstances. Naomi has built a solid four-year history with her supervisor Ichiro and seems to sincerely wants to do well for both herself and B.A.B.E.L.. However, during one of her missions when she is charged with stopping a psychic who uses his powers to molest women, she begins to have trouble using her powers and accidentally injures her supervisor. After training with the Children, she has a simulated duel with Kaoru acting exactly as the psychic she tried to stop. Naomi realizes that Ichiro's intense affection for her is not entirely the altruistic and professional working relationship that it is supposed to be. When they next meet the peeping esper, Naomi takes out both the esper and her somewhat perverted supervisor. It is at this point Naomi gains the nickname "Wild Cat", the rationale of which is demonstrated whenever Ichiro tries to manipulate Naomi and fails to keep his professional (and physical) distance. Unlike The Children, Naomi seems to be able to deactivate her limiter without Ichirou's assistance almost at will. Since Naomi tends to rush through all her enemies whenever she has to fight, it is not that much of a stretch to surmise that there is probably a time limit whose expiration automatically reactivates the limiter. Naomi ages to eighteen years old after the two-year timeskip and starts college. In the omake pages, Naomi is introduced to her new kōhai, the younger Sasami twins, who are also under the care of supervisor Ichiro Tanizaki.
Her last name is for the chapter "Umegae" (梅枝) in The Tale of Genji.

Ichiro is the heavy-smoking thirty-six-year-old supervisor of Umegae Naomi. He has become extremely attached to his esper charge over the four years since her supernatural powers were discovered when she was twelve-years-old. While he has done a good job of administrating the development of Naomi's social character which has allowed the use of her telekinesis for constructive ends, Ichiro has also demonstrated signs of a lecherous personal agenda to refine Naomi into his "ideal woman". Despite having twice been on the receiving end of Naomi's telekinesis misfiring and her telekinetic exhortations to keep a professional distance, Ichiro has not been convinced to abandon his lecherous personal agenda and has a developed a masochistic facet to his obsessions.  After the timeskip, in the omake pages, Ichiro becomes mentor to "The Little Mice."
He is named after Tanizaki Jun'Ichiro (谷崎潤一郎), an author who translated The Tale of Genji into modern Japanese.

The Hound

Fifteen-year-old Akira wields his Level 4 metempsychosis as a member of The Hound Special Esper Team alongside his partner Hatsune. As has been demonstrated, Akira's metempsychosis works by interchanging his soul with that of any nearby organism and affords him several situational and structural advantages that his normal anthropoid form cannot. Unfortunately, there is an obstinate operating range beyond which Akira's metempsychotic subjugation will be disrupted and the interchange reversed. It is not that out of the question for B.A.B.E.L. to make a standard practice of storing Akira's anthropoid form in a heavily guarded vehicle that follows after to keep him in that operation range.
His last name is after the chapter "Yadorigi" (宿木) in The Tale of Genji.

Fourteen-year-old Hatsune avails her Level 4 metamorphosis as a member of The Hound Special Esper Team alongside of her partner Akira. Much to Akira's chagrined frustration, Hatsune demonstrates the proclivity to behave her default lupine alternate manifestation which is only at its greatest efficacy when she is hungry—hungry as in 'have not eaten for days' ravenous rather than merely being peckish. Unfortunately, Hatsune's voracious appetite does have the tendency to displace the mission at hand. Even as this flaw is somewhat diminished as Minamoto trains her, Hatsune still has to overcome the fact that she computes and conducts in lupine/canine maneuvering rather than anthropoid action. Even with her canine conduct and gluttony set aside for the moment, Hatsune demonstrates a proclivity to become enthralled with anyone that sees past her exterior to interact with her as a human being and twice tries to claim Minamoto for herself. As Kaoru emphatically and vigorously demonstrates at her natural potency designation during an exercise regarding Minamoto and his affiliation, whoever is decided upon to supervise Hatsune will have to establish and maintain dominance right from the start without being cruel or despotic. She has romantic feeling for Akira, as shown when Keiko first became their commander, she did not accept Keiko, as she was jealous.
Her first name is for the chapter "Hatsune" (初音).

Keiko Kojika is introduced in Episode 35 as the new supervisor for The Hound Special Esper Team due to her love of animals. Even taking into account her recent recruitment into B.A.B.E.L. and her declared determination to do her job well, Keiko has to develop her own groove of guiding Akira and Hatsune through their missions. While helping her to learn the fundamental mechanics of the B.A.B.E.L. workplace, Akira develops a sycophantic and uxorious affection for Keiko that leads him to accidentally neglect Hatsune who tries to interchange Special Esper Teams only to encounter with Minamoto since it is in his apartment that Hatsune and his esper charges are being housed. In an attempt to restore homeostasis, B.A.B.E.L. initiates a simulated polar medical rescue mission for Keiko to lead Hatsune through. In spite of unexpected electromagnetic interference and a sustenance rations that are of no utility, Keiko finds her groove in B.A.B.E.L. as The Hound field supervisor when her timely intercession extricates Hatsune from an unwise/unnecessary battle that she cannot win along with the hypothermia from being in the frigid water. After that mission, Keiko conducts herself as an excellent team leader once everybody knows where the boundaries are. She appears to look up to her senior Tanizaki with much admiration, much to everyone elses' disbelief.

The Shadow of The Children

As his name suggests, Bullet is best known for his ability to telekinetically maneuver discharged gun bullets through the air at an adversary and (as Hyobu is shocked to have demonstrated on him) even through its body after penetration. While Black Phantom was wielding him as his vassal, Bullet has also propelled gun bullets at such velocities that even telekinetic/psychokinetic force-fields are of no utility in deflecting them in spite of the fact that they are greatly decelerated. Bullet's emancipation from BLACK PHANTOM occurs during the backdrop of a long-range assassination mission which P.A.N.D.R.A. foils by interchanging with the authentic political officials so that Hyobu could emancipate Bullet and wield him as a P.A.N.D.R.A. soldier. Bullet successfully held at a stalemate, it is not difficult for Kaoru and her teammates to resolve things using the Triple Boost function.  After the two-year time skip, Bullet along with Tim Toy make their debut as a new team for B.A.B.E.L., although they still suffer from amnesia and a small power loss.  Bullet and Tim Toy regard "The Children" as their saviors, even if they can't exactly remember how they were saved.  Bullet makes use of the optical camouflage stealth suit which was first used by Minamoto and supports The Children when not in missions. Comically, Bullet appears to be an otaku of a fictional anime character called "Chil Chil" and has no interest in the "3D world" except for "The Children", whose beauty apparently surpasses the "two dimensional world."

As his name suggests, Tim Toy is best known for his ability to (as Shiho and Aoi are shocked to have demonstrated on them) emasculate/immobilize individual adversaries by transforming them into toys. While Black Phantom was wielding him as his second vassal, Tim Toy also used psychokinesis and hypnosis to manifest various vehicles into aggressive automatons that are then wielded against his adversaries. Tim Toy's emancipation from BLACK PHANTOM occurs during the backdrop of a huge traffic accident inside of a tunnel. While Naomi and Fujiko hold Tim Toy at a stalemate, it is not difficult for Kaoru and her teammates to resolve things using the Triple Boost function once the automaton is destroyed along with Shiho and Aoi being flown out of range to reverse Tim Toy's earlier spell. After the two-year time skip, Tim Toy along with Bullet make their debut as a new team for B.A.B.E.L., although they still suffer from amnesia and a small power loss.  Tim Toy and Bullet regard "The Children" as their saviors, even if they can't exactly remember how they were saved.  Tim Toy controls the "Shadows of the Children" to stand in for "The Children" when required. Comically, Tim Toy appears to be an otaku of a fictional anime character called "Chil Chil" and has no interest in the "3D world" except for "The Children", whose beauty apparently surpasses the "two dimensional world."

Shadow Kids
Known as the Shadows of the Children, the Shadow Kids are high-functioning mecha replicas of "The Children".  They are designed to stand in for any of The Children as body doubles when they are called away on missions.  The Shadow Kids Project was originally created back when "The Children" were still in elementary school, but due to Kugutsu's betrayal, the project was shut down temporarily. They are remotely controlled by Tim Toy as robotics is still not advanced enough at this stage for complete human-like disguise. When controlling all three of the Shadow Kids for an operation which requires more sensitive precision, Tim Toy will make use of a sensory deprivation tank. Comically, as Tim Toy is not fully aware of "The Children"'s personalities yet, the Shadow Kids switch from perfectly mannered girls to tsundere to all other sorts of personalities.

The Little Mice
Sachio Sasame
Possesses type synthetic power equivalent to level 5 and is able to use it to make hypno, to create visual information.  He is 11 years old and was introduced after the timeskip in the omake pages..  Previously part of a team with his twin sister, he apparently has a large sister-complex and is very besotted with Yukino to the point of not wanting her to grow up and wanting to protect her for his entire life.  Has a dark personality.  When he first appeared, he was posing as his sister using his synthetic esper powers, planning on breaking the team up with internal strife.  He is able to use his powers in a number of ways, such as changing into Yukino, transforming Yukino into something else, changing Yukino's grades, etc... all of them seem to be limited only to Yukino in some manner, however. On his proper appearance in the manga, he has learnt to show illusions of other people.

Yukino Sasame
Level 5 psychokinesis, 11 years old, previously part of a team with her twin brother, but split up two months due to wanting to stand out on her own.  She requested for Ichiro Tanizaki to be her supervisor.  She was first introduced in the omake pages after the timeskip.  Is later revealed in the final pages of her 'storyarc' in the omake pages to have a dark personality just like Sachio. She is dealing with Sachio much like how Naomi deals with Tanizaki.

The Riddle Women
Chizuto Sasame
Level 6 telepathy, 20 years old.  Currently part of the new receptionist team.

Tae Sasame
Level 6 clairvoyance, 19 years old.  Currently part of the new receptionist team.

P.A.N.D.R.A.

Hyobu is the leader of P.A.N.D.R.A. and the series' major antagonist. Despite having the appearance of a high schooler, he is at least 80 years old, but makes use of his powers to conserve his youth. Originally he was Fujiko's adopted brother who joined an esper military unit with her during World War II and by witnessing most of his comrades dying in front of him. Their powers were somehow transferred to him; hence the multitude of esper abilities under his belt. Hyobu developed a deep hatred for normal humans after his former instructor tried to kill him with a shot in the head. After taking heed of a precognition about him leading an uprising of espers versus normals and despite not dying, he gained bullet-shaped scars on his forehead and torso.

Hyobu spent the 10 years prior to the series' beginning living in a maximum security cell in the esper prison. While leading the others to falsely believe he was properly contained (as he could easily escape and return to his cell undetected), while gathering members to establish P.A.N.D.R.A. in preparation for his war against the normals, until his cover is blown and he decides to flee the prison for good. Knowing that The Children will have a pivotal role in the impending esper-normals war, he is usually seen trying to convince them to join his cause, especially Kaoru, whom he labels as his "queen".

Despite Hyobu views Minamoto as a hindrance to his plans, he refrains from taking drastic means to separate him from The Children knowing how they care deeply for him, although he does not believe Minamoto can be able to avoid the ominous fate involving him and Kaoru, believing not only that he is doomed to repeat the mistake of his master, but also that only Hyobu himself is capable to prevent it. During his fight with Gilliam, he is gravely injured, and in order to prevent Black Phantom from using his powers to further develop the esper clones, Hyobu is teleported into another dimension by Feather, while his past memories remain stored into her who transmogrified herself to the image of a child version of him, which is then put under Minamoto's guard along The Children. Just like the original Hyobu, Feather-Hyobu refuses to leave Kaoru's side and despite being weaker than the original Hyobu, his powers made of him a useful asset to The Children, thus he usually accompanies them on missions. Later, Minamoto and Sakaki take heed of a precognition of a future confrontation between The Children and the Phantom Daughter, with Hyobu returning to life in the occasion. When this precognition comes true, Feather-Hyobu sacrifices himself to protect the children and allow the original Hyobu to reappear just as predicted.

Hyobu is the main character of the Zettai Karen Children: The Unlimited spin-off anime series. In the series he uses a pin on his collar that is actually a limiter, which unlocks his true powers when deactivated. When his condition deteriorates to the point that he can not fully control his power, Andy uses his powers to seal Hyobu's abilities up to a certain level and prevent him from causing his own destruction upon using them.

He is named after Prince Hyobu, the father of Murasaki.

 A tall, unshaven middle-aged man with long black hair. He is a synthetic esper, capable of controlling the carbon in his body. He is the principal personal assistant to Hyobu but is far more serious than the Major. He is often at odds with the Major because his pragmatic nature conflicts with Hyobu's lackadaisical personality often causing his efforts to be overlooked. For instance, when Magi went to the trouble of rigging B.A.B.E.L.'s precognition systems to recruit a new member, Hyobu repeatedly ignored his attempts to report it in preference to playing Tetris with Momotaro. Along with Momiji and Yo, the three were raised as children by Hyobu, something Magi finds embarrassing to reflect upon.

Magi is a supporting character in "Zettai Karen Children: The Unlimited".

 A tall woman with long blue hair and sunglasses. She is another of Hyobu's subordinates. Considered to be P.A.N.D.R.A.'s big sister figure, she is generally calm and the voice of reason. Her power was revealed in Volume 15, Sense 127. Her power is a synthesised one with a teleportion base. She fixes a portion of space in one position, and uses that to gain superhuman strength. She can catch high caliber bullets with her fingers with ease fired from Bullet who was able to pierce the telekinetic barriers of both Mary Ford and Colonel Grisham with ease consecutively. Momiji, along with Yo and Magi, was raised by Major Hyobu Kyōsuke himself from childhood.
She is named after the chapter "Momiji no Ga" (紅葉賀). In volume 17 it was revealed that she was romantically interested in the Chief.

Momiji is a supporting character in "Zettai Karen Children: The Unlimited".

 A mid-sized man with spiky orange hair, another of Hyobu's subordinates. He is a synthetic esper with a psychokinetic base. Yo is able to manipulate sound, capable of using sound wave attacks, hearing far away conversations, and throwing his voice. His playful personality leads him to annoy the Major on occasions. Yo appears to have the opinion that P.A.N.D.R.A. shouldn't be dependent on "The Children", and will not hesitate to attempt to kill them much to Hyobu's annoyance. Yo, like the rest of the men in the series, is usually a target of Patty Crew's yaoi fantasies, and she calls him senpai.
He is named after the chapter "Fuji no Uraba" (藤裏葉).

Yo is a supporting character in "Zettai Karen Children: The Unlimited". In reflection of the more serious tone of the show, Yo, while still playful, is a much more effective presence in combat in the series.

 Being the sole surviving wartime experimentation specimen to manufacture an esper animal, Momotaro is Hyobu's squirrel companion that sometimes behaves quite cluelessly as to Hyobu's modus operandi as he adds his commentary to whatever Hyobu does or is deciding. Momotaro's strongly- and frequently-demonstrated affinity for sunflower seeds one night causes him to be sucked into the slipstream of a passing truck and electrocuted by live power lines for no other reason than his obdurate refusal to let go of the seeds. If pushed into combat, Momotaro has the capability to compress the air around him into acoustic concussion missiles that he launches at his adversaries as well as an intense but transient siren that scrambles and encrypts the brain waves of anybody in the vicinity. When Kaoru tries to nurse him back to health, Momotaro has psychotic episodes as he recalls all the experimentation he has undergone that cause him to lash out to tremendous effect but fortunately sees that Kaoru and her teammates are kindred spirits even if he has not yet resolved his hatred for humans as a whole.

Momotaro is a minor supporting character in "Zettai Karen Children: The Unlimited". He serves as a companion and friend to the young girl esper Yugiri.

 In addition to the normal position displacement (disappearing in one position followed by reappearing in another) much like Aoi, the young teleporter Mio can also generate distance-displacement portals that can even ignore physical obstacles as Sakaki has been forced to endure while in the middle of a fight with her bodyguard Yamada. Mio is unwilling to accept Kaoru as any kind of ruler that could replace her crush Hyobu and demonstrates this by kidnapping Minamoto to her very run-down hideout. Minamoto guiding her through proper nutrition/hygiene and even giving her a new outfit inspires Mio but does not stop her vendetta against Kaoru. Mio's downfall is brought about when Minamoto reasons that Mio probably has the same weakness as Akira's metempsychosis. Sure enough, Minamoto transporting Mio's genuine lower half out of range causes Mio to recall her clones, one of which has gone maverick. Kaoru's intercession along with Minamoto's compassion for her inspires Mio to reflect on her conduct even if her jealousy is not yet resolved. Outside of combat, Mio comically has slow responses to things which should be obvious, such as what happens to people in an airtight room which is removed of air. In recent chapters, Mio transferred into The Children's class with other P.A.N.D.R.A. members as new students. Mio is initially aggressive towards Kaoru, but eventually develops a warm friendship with her, even if she hides it behind a tsundere facade.

She is named after the chapter "Miotsukushi" (澪標).

Mio is not featured as a character within "Zettai Karen Children: The Unlimited", but she does get a short cameo at the end of the 5th Ending of the series.

 Patty Crew was originally part of BLACK PHANTOM. In a mission with Kaoru, Momiji, Kazura, Kagari, Mio and Momotaro, Patty was the target to be saved from the organization. She was being used to destroy P.A.N.D.R.A. Although Kaoru destroyed the grip on her by BLACK PHANTOM, she tried to kill herself because of mind-control self-destruct programming after a loss. Hyoubu speculates that the Pandra Boost was not a complete success because of this fact; this is likely considering Kaoru realized the power was weaker. In the end of the anime and also in recent manga chapters, Patty has been shown to have joined P.A.N.D.R.A.  Comically, Patty has a large interest in yaoi pairings, due to Hyobu just copying how Bullet and Timwere treated during their recovery with somewhat little regard, and her normal taciturn personality will change upon seeing any of the male members of P.A.N.D.R.A. (or even male members of B.A.B.E.L.) in questionable situations. This extends to the omake pages where Patty apparently draws doujinshi with male pairings for a hobby, and visits comic conventions and otaku-related places such as Akihabara. When Hyobu goes unconscious and Yo is suggested to give him mouth-to-mouth resuscitation, at which he begs her to help him get out of the situation, but she just says that she wants to draw the situation. Patty and Yo share a tsukkomi-boke relationship.  In recent chapters, Patty transferred into The Children's class with other P.A.N.D.R.A. members as new students.

Patty is a minor character in "Zettai Karen Children: The Unlimited".

 A girl under P.A.N.D.R.A. who has a synthesized power, using tentacles and psychometry. She seems to be paired up on missions with Kagari often, considering her reactions towards him. Kazura appears to have a crush (or stronger feelings) for Kagari, considering her jealousy when he holds Kaoru's hand. In recent chapters, Kazura transferred into The Children's class with other P.A.N.D.R.A. members as new students. She gets along especially well with Aoi, as she is the one of the P.A.N.D.R.A. kids who scolds stupid behavior.
She is named for the chapter "Tamakazura" (玉鬘), and the character of the same name who was the daughter of To no Chujo.

Kazura is not featured as a character within "Zettai Karen Children: The Unlimited", but she does get a short cameo at the end of the 5th Ending of the series.

 A boy who is part of P.A.N.D.R.A. Kagari is a multipower esper, having abilities such as precognition, psychokinesis, and pyrokinesis. He is terrified of water, as he is a pyrokinesist. He seems to be paired up on missions with Kazura often, considering her reactions towards her. Although he shows attraction to other girls, he feels a special bond with Kazura, although it is not yet known if this is the same kind of bond that Kazura feels with him. In recent chapters, Kagari transferred into The Children's class with other P.A.N.D.R.A. members as new students. He is good friends with Tohno, and in order to stay at school with him, withheld his powers against gangsters who assaulted them, and fought back with only his physical strength.
Named for the chapter "Kagaribi" (篝火).

Kagari is not featured as a character within "Zettai Karen Children: The Unlimited", but he does get a short cameo at the end of the 5th Ending of the series.

 Real name Masuo Okama, Muscle is introduced as the criminal quarry The Children have been charged with apprehending that behaves as if he were a 1960/1970s disco party-goer and has an affinity for muscular male bodies, hence the aspiration for a gold statue fashioned as such. His esper capability is using his telekinesis to burrow through the ground and to petrify people using a gemstone on his belt. A running gag involves one or more of his female opponents striking his genitals in combat. Much to the Children's dismay and horror, Muscle has displayed an attraction towards their trainer, Koichi Minamoto, and is not hesitant to show his affection, such as kissing him in front of them. Ironically, when dressed in normal clothing and not wearing his sunglasses, Muscle is very handsome to the point where women will swoon over his appearance. Even the female members of P.A.N.D.R.A. cannot believe his appearance until his behavior comically reveals who he is.

Muscle is a minor character in "Zettai Karen Children: The Unlimited", because of the more serious tone of the show, his more flamboyant attitude and dress has been quite toned down.

 Accompanying Mio as her personal bodyguard, Yamada is a telepath that once did for a private job management security company what Hotaru does for B.A.B.E.L.—basically detecting and repelling trouble. It is not that out of the question that Yamada was probably prosecuting a security operation in which he was injured, an injury that has left him facially disfigured and verbally but not psychically mute and is now Mio's personal bodyguard to repay Mio having nursed him back to health. Despite his fearsome appearance he is actually one of the most amiable members of P.A.N.D.R.A, being something of a gentle giant when out of combat such as offering Minamoto food and assisting him in cooking Mio a proper meal during their first appearance. Yamada's downfall comes about when Sakaki psychometrically detects his back story and thus cleverly takes advantage of Yamada's disorganized thought processes along with his martial arts ability to use adversarial momentum and inertia to his advantage ultimately proving a match for Yamada's reliance upon brute force.
He is named after Koremitsu, Genji's retainer.

Yamada is a very minor character in "Zettai Karen Children: The Unlimited", mostly relegated to the background.

 Introduced as a very quirky but handy fellow with a proficiency for constructing dolls, Takashi Kugutsu also has the esper ability to animate his creations with anthropoid authenticity. While it has never really been conclusively appraised, Kugutsu has demonstrated the ability to animate/maneuver several of his creations at one time and even conduct a nice conversation—an event that does not happen very often without a request as its ulterior motive. Unfortunately, the euphoria of watching Kugutsu happily do his esper thing for B.A.B.E.L. is tempered by the fact that he is a spy whose purpose seems to be researching and appraising the B.A.B.E.L. Special Espers and ancillary personnel for Hyobu. Although he is perfectly fine with being left in peace to do the whole doll thing, Kugutsu demonstrates signs of demonstrating the common anthropoid social affinities of infatuation and of wanting to be acknowledged/appreciated a desire complicated by his implied esper ability to subconsciously slip beneath the notice of others. Perhaps the most prominent manifestation of this is capitulating to Kaoru's blackmail when she detects him appraising Kashiwagi's corporeal dimensions at distance (a life-sized doll of Kashiwagi in exchange for her silence) and his quiescent morality being annihilated with that life-sized doll at Kashiwagi's hands (who does not—or perhaps does not want to—understand that Kaoru is the intended benefactor rather than himself) during a confrontation in his workshop. Given how it has generally taken him for granted and marginalized him before accusing him of lecherous conduct that is more of the rule with Kaoru or Ichirou, B.A.B.E.L. has a dangerous enemy in Kugutsu. Kugutsu's downfall is brought about when he tries to frame Sakaki as a traitor in order to have him killed without getting his hands dirty; thanks to Minamoto and company, his plot backfires even though he was willing to do his own dirty work. After the timeskip, Takashi has matured somewhat, and while he does not regret leaving B.A.B.E.L., he does regrets the manner in which he left, and apologizes to Sakaki for shooting him. He has also comically become somewhat of a mentor-figure for Bullet and Tim due to their shared interests, and imparts advice about appearance and social etiquette in public regarding their otakuism. Under the pseudonym Mr.9, he is a famous anime figure sculptor and is praised by Bullet and Tim as a god.

Takashi is a very minor character in "Zettai Karen Children: The Unlimited", mostly relegated to the background.

 Her overconfidence manifesting itself as frequently as her chewing gum bubbles, 19-year-old Setsuko demonstrates that she is quite a formidable adversary that lives up to her "Dream Maker" codename once she has a camera loaded with a fresh roll of film. With a click of her camera shutter, Setsuko easily sends her victims into cerebral pseudo-realities of her own custom design that are very difficult to reverse. Setsuko was once a B.A.B.E.L. agent who became bored with the work as a Special Esper and sought greater excitement and euphoria. Considering how she thoroughly enjoyed all the headaches her subterfuge is causing B.A.B.E.L. when Hyobu charges cerebral subjugation of Minamoto to use as a coercion device on Kaoru, it seems that P.A.N.D.R.A. meets this necessity for Setsuko. The only flaw in Setsuko's insurgency against B.A.B.E.L. is that the mechanics of Shiho's psychometry are a close match for those of her hypnotic photography and that Shiho (who fired a bullet right into her camera lens) can establish a direct sight line with her psychometry just as well as with her eyes if the quarry is at the same elevation.

Setsuko is a very minor character in "Zettai Karen Children: The Unlimited", mostly relegated to the background.

Black Phantom

The man who leads the organization named after his alias, "Black Phantom" appears to be a middle-aged to elderly man always surrounded in shadows. He has a lack of regard on the lives of espers, and with his daughter Yuri Kumoi, brainwashes espers to serve in his group and has them die by suicide if they are in a position where they cannot escape or deemed useless. There are hints that he is not completely heartless, as one of his subordinates that visited Yuri told her that he was rather depressed when she did not show up to Black Phantoms anniversary.

Gilliam is the son Black Phantom and Yuri's brother. He plans to mass-produce esper clones as a type of industry. He has risen in power since Yuri's disappearance with the intention to prove himself to his father, trying to convince him that he is more suitable than his sister to become his right-hand man.

Theodore seems to be in a high position within BLACK PHANTOM, and carries orders from Yuri's father, Black Phantom, to Yuri.  He delivered Nai to aid Yuri.

Nai is a younger girl who is a teleporter, and manifests her abilities in the form of shadows.  She also has a sensing power. Her name literally means "nothing". She has been blinded with a blindfold since birth to make her less prone to emotions, and to become an easy tool for Black Phantom. After Nai's brainwashing is removed by Kaoru's Force of Absolution, it is revealed that her head contained an explosive to kill her should she eventually escapes from Black Phantom's control, which is eventually removed by the combined efforts of Hyobu, Fujiko and Sakaki. Since then her eyesight has improved and she now watches over Yuri, concealing her appearance by assuming the form of a black kitten which keeps her company.

A silent assassin dressed in full body armor and mask, and wielding ninja weapons such as a ninjato and shuriken,  Ninja Hanzo was sent to protect BLACK PHANTOM's secrets. After killing the two contacts onboard and downing the aeroplane Minamoto and Sasaki was in, Ninja Hanzo engaged in prolonged combat with Fujiko. With the fight affecting the both of them in hunger, thirst, and the need to dispose of bodily waste, they were interrupted by a herd of water buffalo, and the hitman escaped in the confusion.  Having found a moment to relieve himself, Ninja Hanzo was attacked by a water buffalo containing the soul of an animal specialist esper.  Later, he sends a SOS to the head of BLACK PHANTOM, but due to failing his mission, is told 'to die'. Despite this, Ninja Hanzo's brainwashing does not seem to be very strong, as instead, in the omake panels, he manages to find refuge with Mirage in Japan who presumably adopts him out of pity. Ninja Hanzo remains out of sight when the Yuri Kumoi personality is awake, and secretly helps out with her chores such as cooking.

Comerica

Liberty Bell
 

A lieutenant in the Japanese Comerican esper team Liberty Bell, Ken wields his clairvoyance alongside his partner Mary to perform the same kind of police work that B.A.B.E.L. does in Japan but on an international scale. Ken befriends Minamoto and Sakaki who guide him through the correct technique for eating soba noodles in spite of being suspected of voyeurism at a hot spring resort when he is introduced alongside his partner Mary when they were hunting Mute and Lige. Mute and Lige now behind bars, Ken has gone on to demonstrate that he has an integral role in Colonel Grisham's back story (working alongside him in the Federal Bureau of Investigation and that he is somewhat clumsy in regards to the social and cultural mechanics of Japan as he once left his shoes at the Tokyo Shinkansen station prior to heading west to Kyoto. If he really puts his mind to it, Ken's clairvoyance has a maximum range of the Kyoto-Tokyo intercity distance.

Mary Ford

A lieutenant in the Japanese Comerican esper team Liberty Bell, Mary avails her Level 6 telekinesis alongside her partner Ken to perform the same kind of police work that B.A.B.E.L. does in Japan but on an international scale. In spite of engaging a devious and dubious device for appraising Kaoru's powers along with those of her teammates, Mary is also found to be a potent ally as she demonstrates when she and Kaoru combine their telekinesis to subdue the fleeing Mute and Lige along with rallying behind her leader Colonel Grisham (as well as Kaoru and Naomi) to drain away a reservoir at whose bottom is Saya's childhood home. Mary tends to find herself in a lot of awkward and comical situations due to her mammaries.

Colonel J.D. Grisham
Code name: Esper Killer

His title of "Esper Killer" being justly earned due to his Level 7 telepathy enabling him to use the powers of espers close to him. Aside from being a horrible karaoke singer, J.D. teaches that an esper's powers vary directly with its willpower—a lesson Kaoru has demonstrated upon her whenever her concentration falters while using her telekinesis. Fortunately, Kaoru figures this out and works alongside Mary and Naomi to help drain a reservoir after Minamoto excavates into his back story. J.D.'s prime volition is for B.A.B.E.L. and Liberty Bell collaboration to grant the terminally ill Saya her final wish – to see her birthplace under the reservoir after she nursed him back to health during the equivalent of World War II, after an esper soldier (Hyobu) destroyed his bomber and its crew, leaving him as the sole survivor. His name is a possible to author John Grisham, and his physical appearance resembles Dr. Chaos from an earlier manga by the same author, Ghost Sweeper Mikami.

Other

  / Carrie

It is unclear if her captain title means that she is the lead pilot or if she has a military rank. Carrie's roles are different in the manga and anime.

In the manga, Caroline was a level two telepath with had dormant psychokinesis who was first mentioned in chapter 76 "Mansion Scandal" and introduced in chapter 93 "Vestiges". She chose to join an experiment that is to awaken her dormant abilities. The experiment was a success in that it awakened her dormant powers, but at the price of creating a second personality. The second personality which the researchers dubbed "Carrie" only has access to the psychokinesis and can't access the telepathy. Carrie causes an explosion and meets Minamoto, instantly liking him. Minamoto took care of her and she slowly started to gain Caroline's knowledge. Eventually, the Comerican government wants to get their hands on her before Carrie reverts to Caroline, but the professors, guided by their conscience help stop them along with Sasaki who drives Minamoto and Carrie away. Eventually Carrie reverts to Caroline but chooses to stay as a separate conscience. Caroline eventually becomes an astronaut and goes to Japan for a space shuttle launch. She chooses to visit Minamoto before she leaves so that he could meet Carrie who she gets along with. They then meet the children and eventually go to space. Some time later, Carrie sends Minamoto a text message from space angering the children and causing Kaoru to throw Minamoto's phone to the moon.

In the anime, while she is mentioned in Episode 40, she is properly introduced in episode 43. In her role in the anime, Caroline collided into Minamoto when he and Sakaki were university students in Comerica while en route to an experiment to endow artificial high-level esper powers. In Caroline's case, this would be her Level 2 psychokinesis. According to Sakaki, Minamoto had been charged the administration of Caroline's rehabilitation after the experiment results in the childish personality Carrie that has very potent psychokinetic and acoustic powers but not the maturity for their prudent use (much like was the case with Kaoru). The extreme ease of visually distinguishing whether Carrie or Caroline is the active personality (hairstyle and eyes) being set aside for the moment, Kaoru and her teammates are shocked to learn that Carrie is just as zero-sum regarding Minamoto as they themselves are and can stand shoulder-to-shoulder with them in terms of power. Carrie voluntarily sealed herself so that Caroline could realize her childhood dream of being an astronaut after a month of fiercely studying about life and all the knowledge necessary to be an adult galvanized by the prospect of marriage to Minamoto. Unfortunately, Caroline has four major obstacles to neutralize. First, even though she made the decision to seal herself away, Carrie is not about to peacefully forego the opportunity to spend a few more moments with Minamoto who she loves romantically. Second, Minamoto's esper charges (who most likely do not make the distinction between the two personalities) are just as zero-sum about Minamoto as she herself is and are not afraid to charge into battle with her to set the score straight even in defiance of B.A.B.E.L.'s official neutrality stance. Third, Comerica wants to retain the capability to synthesize high-level espers at will and does not want any dysphoric exceptions to become community discourse (hence Ken pointing his gun at Carrie). Finally, Hyobu is always on the prowl for additional espers to wield in his upcoming war against humans – and Carrie more than meets the necessary parameters since she does not understand how to use her powers responsibly and that it is not wise to trust everybody.

Foundation
Sophie Grace

The princess of the kingdom of Monarch, she is one of the new characters introduced in The Unlimited anime series. Dedicated to ensure peace between Espers and Normals, she sponsors several efforts to bolster the international trust in the espers and to that objective, she establishes the Foundation, an organization who overseers national esper agencies from around the globe and hires Andy as one of her main operatives.

First appearing in The Unlimited anime series, Andy is a Japanese-Comerican esper with heterochromic eyes. He has the ability to negate other espers' powers either through touch or simply by raising a constant negating field around him. However, because he has no offensive abilities and thanks to his time in the US military, he has become a trained and deadly martial artist and weapons expert. He meets Hyobu while being held in a esper prison in an unnamed country and escapes with him and Yūgiri before being recruited into P.A.N.D.R.A. His esper abilities cause other espers near him to feel ill and thus his mind can't be read, until he is given a specially-crafted limiter by Hyobu that he wears as a necklace. Later, it is revealed that Andy is a secret agent from the United States ESPer Intelligence (USEI) sent to infiltrate the organization. However, his allegiance to the USEI begins to come into question as he is influenced by Hyobu, Yūgiri, and the familial atmosphere of the members of P.A.N.D.R.A.. After Yūgiri is kidnapped by the USEI, Andy severs ties with his superiors and joins Hyobu to rescue her and stop their plans before leaving to parts unknown, losing his powers in the occasion when he uses them to put a limit in Hyobu's powers in order to prevent his death. He later reappears in the manga as part of "Foundation" and for some reason, he now wears an eyepatch.

Andy is a major character within "Zettai Karen Children: The Unlimited".

Originally seen as a character from The Unlimited anime series. Yūgiri is a young composite esper girl and member of P.A.N.D.R.A., who is held in an esper prison before being rescued by Hyobu. She is a very high-level esper with the ability to use telepathy, precognition, and her strongest ability, hypnosis. It is later discovered that she is a clone created by one of P.A.N.D.R.A.'s enemies called "The Merchants of the Dead", and that after she accidentally caused their downfall, she was found sometime later by Hyobu, who had been searching for her ever since the incident happened. He befriends her and invites her to join P.A.N.D.R.A., to which she accepts. Because of this, Yūgiri is completely loyal to Hyobu and cares for him dearly. Over the course of the series, she also develops a big brother/little sister relationship with Andy as well, and is implied that in some moment she leaves P.A.N.D.R.A. to live with him and Sophie in Monarch. She's properly introduced in the manga when it is revealed that she was a first generation prototype clone ESPer created by Black Phantom.

Yūgiri is a major character within "Zettai Karen Children: The Unlimited" and is named after Genji's first child with Aoi no Ue.

Code name: Dazzling High Priestess

Yuri is an esper with high level hypnosis, able to use illusions to fake her location as well as make decoys of herself. She also able to use her brainwashing to force other espers into using their powers for her own use or against themselves. Interested in The Children after learning of their identity, she joins the same middle school as Kaoru, Aoi and Shiho, under the alias , a fake persona created to conceal her real identity. After he learned about her identity, Hyobu uses his powers on Yuri to seal almost all her memories, except from her time as Yuri Kumoi. Upon regaining her lost memories, Yuri decides to betray Black Phantom and erase all of her friends' memories of her and all data regarding her from B.A.B.E.L. and P.A.N.D.R.A. databases before disappearing. She later reappears to put a stop on Black Phantom's cloning experiments and sacrifice herself in atonement for her crimes as the Phantom Daughter. However, Yuri is rescued by Kaoru and the others, and leaves to Monarch, where she lives peacefully with Sophie and Yūgiri.

The Children's classmates
Chisato Hanai (花井ちさと)

A Level 2 telepath, Chisato is one of The Children's classmates that has a warm childhood history with Masaru Tono. Curious about whether he will still accept her after learning that she is an esper, Chisato reads Tono's thoughts to learn that he sees her for the person she is before her telepathy but makes the mistake of sharing the news. Chisato demonstrates the tendency to assume culpability for Tono's aversion for all espers as well as his conflict with Kaoru. Over time, though, Chisato starts to become curious and suspicious when she sees some patterns/practices that suggest that Kaoru/Shiho/Aoi are not the kids they seem/profess to be. It remains to be seen as to what Chisato decides to do what she discovers. Based on her reactions, she is shown to feelings for Tono, despite denying them.
She is named after the chapter "Hana-chiru Sato" (花散里); also the character of the same name, a lover of Genji.

Masaru Tono (東野 将)

Offended by Chisato's telepathic intrusion into his thoughts, Tono takes his anguish too far and it blossoms into an intense aversion for all espers. Fortunately, it seems that Tono has gotten over Chisato's intrusion since he has met his athletic rival in his new classmate Kaoru who he suspects used her telekinesis to bean him in the head with an eraser when they first met. Based on his reactions, he shows his true feelings for Chisato, despite denying them. He is named after To no Chujo (頭中将), Genji's best friend.

Other characters
Feather
An artificial being originally seen as a set of special earrings used by Yuri (the same pair worn by future Kaoru in the visions, although one gets destroyed and it changes the future slightly accordingly). Feather wishes to protect Yuri, along with everyone else. She gives one of the special earrings meant for Kaoru to Minamoto, asking him to investigate it. After some research from Fujiko in the Impalahen kingdom, where the earrings were created, Feather is revealed to surpass the strength of level 7 espers.

Later events causes her to leave Yuri into the care of B.A.B.E.L., where she eventually possesses a special gel-like material with special quantities, and formed into a human woman's body, although due to the strain from saving Minamoto and exercising various different level 7 powers, including healing severe injuries and teleportation which she lacked before, she reformed into the shape of a bird, and put under Minamoto's care, as B.A.B.E.L. is unable to contain her. Later she confesses to Minamoto that she is originally from the future with her powers and memories implanted into her by Kaoru, Aoi, Shiho and Yuri's future selves, who made use of the Triple Boost to send her to the past with the intention to prevent the war between espers and normals to occur. She knows that changing the future will lead to her being erased from the space-time continuum, as with the war averted, so will be the reasons for her creation, but is still determined to accomplish the mission she is given by Kaoru and the others, as along their memories, she also has the will to create a peaceful future for them.

After joining Hyobu in a failed attempt to take down Black Phantom for good, she teleports Hyobu's body to an alternate dimension to prevent it from being used by Gilliam to further advance his research while storing his memories into her body, assuming a different form resembling him during his childhood days, and returns to her previous form when Hyobu is revived as well.

Eiji Saotome

Eiji Saotome was the leader of the special esper squad from which Hyobu and Fujiko were part during the war. Hyobu used to look up to Eiji as a father figure until he is betrayed by him, leading to his hatred toward normal humans. Eiji is the one who shot Hyobu upon learning of his role in the esper uprising to occur in the future. It was believed that he was killed by Hyobu just after his attempt to murder him, until it is revealed in The Unlimited that he has survived and joined a conspiration intended to alter the future by increasing worldwide prejudice against espers. To achieve this, he kidnaps Yūgiri and brainwashes her as part of his plan to murder the newly elected mayor of New York, but she is stopped by Hyobu and Andy with Minamoto and Sakaki's help. Without any place to hide from the authorities, he is found by Hyobu who rejects his plea to kill him and erases all of his memories instead. Hyobu views Minamoto and Kaoru's relationship as similar to the one he had with Eiji, thus he believes that despite Minamoto's efforts to support her, he shall eventually betray her just like Eiji did to him.

Kiriko Suma (須磨貴理子)

The former supervisor of "The Children", Suma seems to hate being in the supervisor role and behaves toward Kaoru, Shiho, and Aoi as if they are animals. The ESP portal limiters that Suma gave "The Children" are fashioned as chokers and are deactivated with the password 'Solomon', a powerful and wise king in the Old Testament who used a magic ring to converse with animals and control devils. As a government advisor, she was immune from B.A.B.E.L.'s commands, much to the grief of Taizo. Her past is revealed in the manga as her upbringing by her parents was apparently severely harsh to the point of child abuse. This led her to believe that in order for "The Children" to be good kids, they have to be treated strictly with severe punishments if they misbehave, just as she was. Her current status is unknown after Minamoto takes over command of "The Children".
She is named after the "Suma" (須磨) chapter.

The Children/Minamoto's family members

Minamoto family
Koichi's mother
The matriarch of the family, Koichi's mother is very affectionate towards her son, and scolds him for acting like a middle schooler due to his embarrassment by her hug in front of Sakaki. She is bad at cooking, which led Minamoto at a young age to learn how to cook by being self-taught and through a scientific approach. Initially thought by Aoi and Shiho to be his potential marriage partner, on learning the truth, they immediately switch to kimono and become demure and polite. She finds all of the three Espers under Minamoto's charge extremely cute, and jokingly, approves and encourages all three of The Children to marry Minamoto, all at the same time if possible.
She is well aware of her son's nature, choosing to let him go at his own pace, and secretly disrupts the marriage interview, as neither party intended to go through with it.

Torte
Minamoto's pet dog, who is also very affectionate towards Minamoto, even though he rarely visits home. A flashback shows he had Torte as a puppy since he was in elementary school.

Koichi's father
Nothing has been revealed about him other than that he is a busy businessman who frequently works and travels.

Koichi's grandmother
Not much is known about her other than she did the cooking for the Minamoto family as her daughter is horrible at cooking, and when she was hospitalized, her grandson Minamoto learnt how to cook from scratch to continue on in her stead. Because Koichi's mother was busy at work, and Koichi's mother was busy looking after her in hospital, Minamoto had to travel to Comerica alone and live by himself. She died roughly two to three years before the series started.

Akashi family
Yoshimi Akashi

Yoshimi is Kaoru's gravure idol elder sister that is about Minamoto's age. Given the prominent cleavage that both she and Akie have, it can be argued that the origins of Kaoru's lesbian lechery lie here. Considering the 11-year difference in age, Yoshimi is probably not really affected that much by her parents' divorce and just has no clue how to help Kaoru. As with Akie, she deals with this with her work and dating. Much to Kaoru's annoyance, Yoshimi sees Minamoto as an ideal potential husband due to his youth, looks, intelligence, and elite status.

Akie Akashi

Considering how well she maintains herself, it is difficult to believe that Akie is Kaoru's actress mother who divorced Kaoru's father five years ago when Kaoru was delivered into B.A.B.E.L. stewardship. Considering the time frame, it is not that much of a stretch to surmise that Kaoru's father has either been driven off or killed by Kaoru's Level 7 telekinesis going out of control which frightens Akie right out of administrating over her younger daughter's childhood development in contrast to Minamoto actually setting limits for Kaoru—and enduring the resulting verbal and telekinetic objections thereof. Akie's inability or unwillingness to see Kaoru as her daughter that happens to be an esper leads her to place a heavy emphasis upon her work. Much like her two daughters, Akie also sees Minamoto as an ideal husband regardless of their age difference.

Sannomiya family
General Director Sannomiya

A man that believes that a citizen's obligation to assist the authorities by whatever means is available under the circumstances regardless of age, he is Shiho's father and the director (much like Fujiko is the head of B.A.B.E.L.) of the National Police Agency that appears to have a grasp of the esper potency grading system but does not realize that a Level 7 psychometer like Shiho is not the universal skeleton key to the world. Director Sannomiya is not a hopelessly lost cause when he sees that Shiho is very good at figuring out the correct situational modus operandi for wielding her psychometry and takes quick action to rush to his daughter's rescue. In the omake scenes, his personality is apparently due to becoming a tsundere father on learning Shiho was a level 7 psychometer as a baby so that she would find love for her powers. However, he was apparently always like that, as a flashback shows him giving flowers to his wife-to-be in a tsundere manner.

Shiho's mother
A beautiful woman who has only appeared in the omake comics. (she also appeared in chapter 138, page 6 when the Children graduated from middle school). Like her husband, she decided to try hard for Shiho's sake, and this involved always speaking what she was thinking. This would comically result in her not hiding what she was thinking at all times, including stating she loves young men, Minamoto in particular.

Nogami family

A little boy that clearly loves his older sister and wishes that she were at home with him, Yuki is Aoi's junior brother. While he generally understands that Minamoto is important to Aoi, Yuki interprets his constant proximity to his sister as a threat that might steal his sister forever. Yuki finds ignorant foreigners such as the Comerican esper Ken comical, genuine, and 'safe' – as it is highly unlikely that his sister will have an attraction towards such people.

Daisaku Nogami
Originating from Osaka, as in many families, Daisaku sees himself as the breadwinner of the Nogami family. Unfortunately his working diligence causes Daisaku to manage his family life very poorly – the greatest symptom of which being his eldest daughter Aoi formerly being a lonesome recluse with no motivation or confidence. Even though her teammates Kaoru and Shiho have done a lot to reverse this alongside their leader Minamoto and the various B.A.B.E.L. personnel, Aoi is still somewhat adversely affected by his past neglect. Daisaku, like most men, has been shown to be weak to youthful ladies with large breasts paying him attention, to his wife's chagrin.

Mari Nogami
Mari tries to act as a housewife but is no better at this than her husband as breadwinner considering the anguish of her eldest daughter Aoi. Mari has a passive-aggressive frustration dynamic with her husband that embarrasses Aoi and sets a poor example for her son Yuki that suggests that she and her husband need to be parented just as much as their children and is reflected by her irresponsible spending habits. The Nogami family live in a modest modern style japanese home as noted by Ken's disappointment at the less than traditional construction.

References

External links
Anime official website 

Psychic Squad